HAT-P-30, also known as WASP-51, is the primary of a binary star system about 700 light-years away. It is a G-type main-sequence star. HAT-P-30 has a similar concentration of heavy elements compared to the Sun.

The faint stellar companion was detected in 2013 at a projected separation of 3.842″.

Planetary system 
In 2011 a transiting hot Jupiter planet b  was independently detected by two teams.

The planetary orbit is strongly misaligned with the equatorial plane of the star, the misalignment angle being equal to 73.5°.

Since 2022, an additional planet in the system is suspected based on transit timing variations.

References 

Hydra (constellation)
G-type main-sequence stars
Binary stars
Planetary systems with one confirmed planet
Planetary transit variables
J08154797+0550121
Durchmusterung objects